McGillivray Ridge is located on the border of Alberta and British Columbia. Sometime before 1814, this massive mountain was called McGillvray's Rock after William McGillivray of the NWC.

See also
 List of peaks on the Alberta–British Columbia border
 Mountains of Alberta
 Mountains of British Columbia

References

Landforms of Alberta
Ridges of British Columbia
Ridges of Canada